Hemmingford, Quebec may refer to:
Hemmingford, Quebec (township), a township municipality
Hemmingford, Quebec (village), a village municipality enclaved in the township